Ingeborg Hunzinger (3 February 1915, in Berlin – 19 July 2009, in Berlin) was a German sculptor.

Life and career
Hunzinger was born Ingeborg Franck to a Jewish mother. In 1932 Ingeborg joined the Communist Party. She was an apprentice stone mason in Würzburg from 1936 until 1938. She was then pupil of Ludwig Kasper for the duration of 1938/39 When the Nazis prevented her continued education and teaching in 1939, she emigrated to Italy. There, she met the German painter Helmut Ruhmer. In 1942, they returned to the Black Forest, Germany, and had two children. However, because of Ingeborg's part-Jewish ancestry, they were not allowed to marry within the country.

Ruhmer was killed in the last year of World War II and Ingeborg married Adolf Hunzinger in the mid-fifties, with whom she had her third child. After a divorce from Hunzinger, she married the sculptor Robert Riehl in the mid-sixties.

Hunzinger resumed her art studies in East Berlin in the early fifties; she was a master pupil of Fritz Cremer and Gustav Seitz. She taught at the Academy of Art Berlin-Weißensee and worked from 1953 as a free-lance artist. She joined later the Party of Democratic Socialism.

In 1995, Hunzinger created Block der Frauen (Block of Women) on the site of the Old Synagogue where the Rosenstrasse protests took place. She created this to honour the courage of the women who fought to protect their families.

Hunzinger was the grandmother of the writer Julia Franck.

Selected works

Literature
 Christel Wollmann-Fiedler: Ingeborg Hunzinger. Die Bildhauerin. Wuppertal: HP Nacke Verlag, 2005. 
 Rengha Rodewill: Einblicke – Künstlerische - Literarische - Politische. The sculptor Ingeborg Hunzinger. With letters from Rosa Luxemburg. Karin Kramer Verlag, Berlin 2012,

References

External links

"Ingeborg Hunzinger gestorben", Junge Welt (20 July 2009) 
Short biography and list & B/W photos of her works in Berlin 
"93-Jährige formt Denkmal für Rosa Luxemburg" [93-year-old forms memorial for Rosa Luxemburg] by Kathrin Hedtke, Der Tagesspiegel (15 April 2008) 

1915 births
2009 deaths
Artists from Berlin
Jewish emigrants from Nazi Germany to Italy
German women sculptors
20th-century German sculptors
20th-century German women artists